The 1876 United States presidential election in Ohio was held on November 7, 1876 as part of the 1876 United States presidential election. State voters chose 22 electors to the Electoral College, who voted for president and vice president.

Ohio was narrowly won by the Republican Party candidate and native son, Rutherford B. Hayes, with 50.21% of the popular vote. The Democratic Party candidate, Samuel J. Tilden, garnered 49.07% of the popular vote. This marks the weakest performance in the Buckeye state for any victorious Republican candidate, seeing as no Republican has won the White House without carrying Ohio.

Results

Results by county

See also
 United States presidential elections in Ohio

References

Ohio
1876
1876 Ohio elections